Xixiu Miao is a small Miao language of China that is closely related to Hmong: Hmong, Small Flowery Miao, and Xixiu are listed as the three local dialects of the Chuanqiandian Cluster of the West Hmongic languages. There are only 300 speakers, in the Xixiu District of Anshun Prefecture, Guizhou Province.

References

West Hmongic languages
Languages of China